Mrs. Jones' Birthday is a 1909 short American comedy film featuring Fatty Arbuckle. It was Arbuckle's second onscreen performance.

Cast
 Roscoe 'Fatty' Arbuckle (as Roscoe Arbuckle)

See also
 List of American films of 1909
 Fatty Arbuckle filmography

References

External links

1909 films
1909 short films
American silent short films
American black-and-white films
1909 comedy films
Silent American comedy films
American comedy short films
1900s American films